Belfast St Anne's can refer to:

Belfast St Anne's (Northern Ireland Parliament constituency)
Belfast St Anne's (UK Parliament constituency)